Hassanpur is a town (MC) in Palwal district in the Indian state of Haryana

Education

Schools
Aadrash Vidya Mandir Sr Secondary School
B.L. Public senior secondary  School
Brij Mandal Senior secondary school
Govt High Senior secondary school for girls
Govt High Senior secondary school for girls
KCM Public School
Janta Vidya Mandir
Sarasvati Vidya Mandir Sr Secondary School
 Maa Omwati
 SRS Public School

College
Maa Omwati Degree college
Maa Omwati Institute Of Management.

Demographics
 India census,  Hassanpur had a population of 11569. Males constitute 53% of the population and females 47%. Hassanpur has an average literacy rate of 60%, lower than the national average of 74.4%. In Hassanpur, 16.4 of the population is under 6 years of age.

Notable People from Hassanpur 

 Rohtas Goel Indian Billionaire and founder of Omaxe Limited was born in Hassanpur
 Girraj Kishore Mahaur, Former MLA of Hasanpur

References

Cities and towns in Palwal district
Palwal